Christian Sugiono (born in Jakarta, Indonesia on February 25, 1981) is an Indonesian actor and model of mixed German, Chinese and Javanese descent.

Career 
Sugiono learned to sing and play bass guitar for his appearance in the 2006 film Dunia Mereka. He was honoured for his work on this film with a nomination as Best Actor in the Bandung Film Festival Awards. He is also known for starring in the 2005 film Catatan Akhir Sekolah. In 2007, he appeared in the Malaysian film, Tipu Kanan Tipu Kiri or 100 Lies To Hide A Wife. This film was released to a wider audience than his earlier films, gaining international attention, primarily throughout Asia.

Christian is one of the co-founder of MBDC Media, an online media company in Indonesia. Currently he act as the CEO of the company, with its flagship product: Malesbanget.com, Indonesian humor viral media and video channels.

In 2014, MBDC Media closed investment partnerships with Rebright Partners from Japan and 500 Startup.

Personal background 
Sugiono's ancestry is a combination of Chinese-Indonesian, Javanese and German. While his father is from Indonesia, his mother is German. Sugiono is the second child, having both a younger and older brother.

Sugiono currently lives in Indonesia with award-winning actress Titi Kamal, with whom he starred in the film Tipu Kanan Tipu Kiri.  On 26 February 2009, Sugiono announced publicly that after a ten-year relationship, he and Titi Kamal were married in Australia on 6 February 2009.

Professional background

Modelling 
In 1997, Sugiono signed on to model for Hai Magazine. His work with Hai served as a catalyst, which increased his value in the entertainment industry. This work resulted in greater exposure leading to more work in the fashion industry, including modelling on runways, and appearing in print and film advertising.

In 2006, Sugiono became a brand ambassador representing Close-Up toothpaste (2006 to present), Hewlett Packard (2008), and Gatsby hair products for men (2008), which is manufactured by the Mandom Corporation in Indonesia.

Filmography

MTV Indonesia 
In 2000, Sugiono left Indonesia for six years to study in Hamburg, Germany. He studied Information Technology, while attending the Technical University of Hamburg. Sugiono gained skills and knowledge in web design, having successfully developed his own website, which presents his professional background, skills, and abilities. During times of unemployment or hiatus in the entertainment industry, Sugiono continues his work in web design and computer programming, working from a web production studio in his home. Additionally, he is proficient in playing the piano, guitar, bass, and drums.

Following his college education, Sugiono returned to Jakarta to focus on his acting and modelling career. He successfully merged his knowledge in computer technology with his professional interests in the entertainment industry, by developing websites and writing articles and reviews of concerts and music festivals held throughout Europe during the summer. He has contributed extensively to Trax Magazine, for MTV Indonesia.

Television appearances 
After Sugiono returned from Hamburg, he began working in a number of roles in telefilms and soap operas.
 2010: Dia Jantung Hatiku (translated: He's my Heart) — (telefilm)
 2010: Amanah dalam Cinta (translated: Amanah In Love) — (telefilm)
 2008: Alisa (translated: Alisa) — (soap opera)
 2007: Kasih (translated: Love) — (soap opera)
 2007: Ratu (translated: Queen) — (soap opera)
 2007: Mukjizat Itu Nyata (translated: Miracles so Real) — (telefilm)
 2007: Gantung – Melly Goeslaw (translated: Hanging – Melly Goeslaw) — (short)
 2006: Mengejar Cinta (translated: Pursuing Love) — (telefilm)
 2006: Dunia Maya (translated: Maya World) — (telefilm)
 2006: Foto Kotak dan Jendela (translated: A Photo Box and A Window)
 2006: Pengantin Remaja (translated: Young Bride) — (soap opera)
 2006: Dunia Tanpa Koma (translated: The World Without Coma) — (telefilm)
 2006: Jomblo (translated: The Bachelor) — (television series)
 2004: Arti Cinta – Ari Lasso (translated: The Meaning Of Love – Ari Lasso) — (short)

Film appearances 
 2005: Catatan Akhir Sekolah (translated: School Endnotes)
 2005: Cinta Silver
 2006: Jomblo (translated: The Bachelor)
 2006: (Bukan) Kesempatan Yang Terlewat (translated: ''(Not) A Missed Opportunity)
 2006: Foto Kotak dan Jendela (translated: Picture Box and Window)
 2006: Jakarta Undercover
 2006: Dunia Mereka (translated: Their World)
 2007: Tipu Kanan Tipu Kiri (translated: 100 Lies To Hide A Wife)
 2008: Saus Kacang (translated: Peanut Sauce)
 2009: Rasa (translated: Feeling)

Film synopsis 
Catatan Akhir Sekolah
Sugiono's onscreen career began when he appeared in the 2005 film, Catatan Akhir Sekolah (translated: School Endnotes) as the film's antagonist, Ray. Written by Salman Aristo and directed by Hanung Bramantyo, this film received the award for Best Film in Indonesian Film Festival. It was also nominated for Best Director and Best Movie in MTV Indonesia Movie Awards. Sugiono went on to work again with Bramantyo in the 2006 film, Jomblo, and with Aristo, in his next film, Cinta silver.

Cinta Silver
In 2005, Sugiono appeared in Cinta Silver, in the role of Vishnu. The screenplay was written by Salman Aristo.

Jomblo (or The Bachelor)
In 2006, his popularity increased after playing the role of Doni in Jomblo (translated The Bachelor). This movie was honoured as the Best Movie at the MTV Indonesia Movie Awards. Following the success of the film, a television series of the same name was created to continue the story on a regular basis.

Tipu Kanan Tipu Kiri (or 100 Lies to Hide A Wife)
In late 2006, Sugiono received an offer to star in the new Malaysian film Tipu Kanan Tipu Kiri (translated 100 Lies to Hide A Wife). In this movie, Sugiono played with his future wife, Titi Kamal, who plays as his wife. The romantic comedy follows the romantic relationship of Rudy, played by Sugiono, and Wulan, played by Titi Kamal. Sugiono and Kamal portrayed a young married couple forced to keep their marriage a secret due to restrictions related to a major lucrative recording contract which stipulated that Wulan remain a single woman.

Directed by Indian filmmaker Sharad Sharan, the romantic comedy was shot in 45 days during February and March around the Klang Valley. The production crew and supporting cast included principles from the established Bollywood film community, as well as individuals from throughout India, Malaysia, and Indonesia. The film was released to venues in Indonesia, Malaysia, Brunei, Singapore and India.

(Bukan) Kesempatan yang Terlewat (or (Not) Missed Opportunity)
In the same year, Sugiono appeared in the Lux short film with Dian Sastrowardoyo in (Bukan) Kesempatan yang Terlewat (translated (Not) Missed Opportunity). This film screened in the Pusan International Film Festival (PIFF) 2007, South Korea. The film tells a story about a young woman repeatedly encounters an attractive young man whenever she commutes by train.

Jakarta Undercover
Sugiono also appeared in the cat-and-mouse thriller Jakarta Undercover, which is based on a novel by Moammar Emka.

Dunia Mereka (or Their World)
Sugiono was honoured for his work on Dunia Mereka (translated Their World), with a nomination as Best Actor in the Bandung Film Festival Awards.

References

External links 
 Official Website
 

1981 births
Living people
Indo people
Javanese people
Indonesian people of Chinese descent
Indonesian people of German descent
Indonesian actors
Indonesian Christians